Rama River may refer to:

 Rama (Neretva), a river in Bosnia and Herzegovina
 Rama (Escondido), a river in Nicaragua, tributary to Escondido